The Glasgow Fair is a holiday usually held during the second half of July in Glasgow, Scotland. 'The Fair' is the oldest of similar holidays and dates to the 12th century. The fair's earliest incarnation occurred in 1190, when Bishop Jocelin obtained permission from King William the Lion to hold the festivities. 

Until the 1960s, most local businesses and factories closed on 'Fair Friday' to allow workers and their families to attend, typically spending their time in the Firth of Clyde or Ayrshire coast. This practice was known as going "doon the watter" (literally "down the water" in the Glasgow dialect).

The Fair
The Glasgow Fair was originally held within the boundaries of Glasgow Cathedral; from the 1800s onward, the fair has taken place on Bellahouston Park. In its earliest incarnations, the fair focused on economic practicalities such as the sale of horses and cattle. In the modern era, the fair has become known for its amusements, with circus and theatre shows as centrepieces.

The Glasgow Fair has been a nexus for travelling showmen, who congregate in order to take advantage of the large audiences. This provided the fair with a diverse roster of entertainers and performances. The 1912 fair, for example, featured a traditional penny gaff as well as short melodramas. The Glasgow Fair also served to introduce attendees to changes in industry and commerce. The 1912 fair also presented a scenic railway that took visitors on a simulated ride through Japan and back to Scotland.

Starting in the 1900s, the Glasgow Fair focused on introducing attendees to global events. In 1917, the following advertisement was printed in a local publication on:

The fair continues to be held annually, though attendance gradually decreased and a large portion of the fair was relocated to Vinegarhill.

See also

References

External links 
 

Culture in Glasgow
Glasgow Green
Holidays in Scotland
Summer events in Scotland